Zeya is a town in Amur Oblast, Russia, located on the Zeya River (a tributary of the Amur)  southeast of Tynda and  north of Blagoveshchensk.

History
It was founded in 1879 as the settlement of Zeysky Sklad (lit. Zeya warehouse), as a supply and administrative center for the exploitation of  newly discovered gold deposits in the Zeya River basin. By 1906, the settlement had grown to over 5,000 inhabitants, and was granted town status under the name Zeya-Pristan (lit Zeya Port). In 1913, the town's name was shortened to Zeya.

The town remained one of Russia's most important centers of gold production until the opening of the Kolyma region in the 1930s.

Construction of the Zeya Dam, beginning in 1964, saw a new growth period for the town.

Administrative and municipal status
Within the framework of administrative divisions, Zeya serves as the administrative center of Zeysky District, even though it is not a part of it. As an administrative division, it is incorporated separately as Zeya Urban Okrug—an administrative unit with the status equal to that of the districts. As a municipal division, this administrative unit also has urban okrug status.

Economy
The Zeya Dam is the main economic focus for the town, with forestry, gold mining and agriculture also conducted in the area.

Climate
Zeya experiences a monsoon influenced humid continental climate (Köppen climate classification Dwb) with frigid, dry winters and short, warm summers.

Sister cities
 Baker City, Oregon, United States

References

Notes

Sources

External links

Official website of Zeya 
Zeya Business Directory 

Cities and towns in Amur Oblast
Populated places established in 1879